Zizia trifoliata, known by the common name of meadow alexanders, is a member of the carrot family, Apiaceae. It is a perennial herb, native primarily to the Appalachian Mountains in the southeastern United States, but is less commonly found throughout Georgia, Florida, Alabama, and Arkansas.

References

External links

trifoliata
Flora of Arkansas
Flora of Alabama
Flora of Florida
Flora of Georgia (U.S. state)
Flora of South Carolina
Flora of Tennessee
Flora of North Carolina
Flora of Kentucky
Flora of West Virginia
Flora of Virginia